EOS is a medical imaging system whose aim is to provide frontal and lateral radiography images, while limiting the X-ray dose absorbed by the patient in a sitting or standing position. The system relies on the high sensitivity of a detector (multi-wire chamber) invented by Georges Charpak, which earned him the 1992 Nobel prize.

EOS is commercialized by the French company EOS imaging as an orthopedic application whose main feature is the 3D visualization of the vertebral column and/or lower limbs of the patients.

References

External links 
Children Hospital of Philadelphia, EOS X-ray Imaging System
Nicklaus Children's Hospital – Presentation of the EOS imaging system
Shriners Hospitals for Children – EOS Delivers Low-Dose Radiation
EOS imaging website

Projectional radiography
Radiology